Garo Sassouni (1889 – 1977) was an Armenian intellectual, author, journalist, revolutionary, educator, and public figure.

Garo Sassouni was born in the village of Aharonk in the Khulb canton of historical Sassoun province and was a relative of famed Armenian revolutionary fighter Hrayr Dzhoghk. He graduated from Mekhitarist institutions in Mush, then received a law degree from the University of Constantinople. He then became an active participant of the Armenian revolutionary movement. He became a member of the parliament of the Independent Republic of Armenia and a provincial governor.

After the fall of the republic he went abroad and became a leader of the Revolutionary Committee of the Armenian Revolutionary Federation. He wrote a large number of Armenian-language historical and cultural studies. He was founding editor of Pakin literary magazine. He died in Beirut, Lebanon at the age of 88.

References 

1889 births
1977 deaths
Armenians from the Ottoman Empire